Knox is a Scottish surname that originates from the Scottish Gaelic "cnoc", meaning a hillock or a hump or the Old English "cnocc", meaning a round-topped hill.

Notable Knoxes include the Presbyterian reformer John Knox and the American Revolutionary War hero Henry Knox; the United States Army facility Fort Knox named after the latter. Other people with this surname include:

People
 Sir Adrian Knox, Australian judge and the second Chief Justice of the High Court of Australia
 Alexander Knox, Canadian actor
 Alfred Knox (1870–1964), British army officer and politician
 Amanda Knox, American woman convicted and acquitted of murdering Meredith Kercher
 Archibald Knox (designer) (1864–1933), designer from Isle of Man
 Archie Knox Scottish football manager
 Arthur Edward Knox (1808–1886), British naturalist and author
 Barbara Knox, British actress mainly known for playing Rita Sullivan in the television soap opera Coronation Street
 Bernard Knox, classicist, and first director of the Center for Hellenic Studies
 Bill Knox (1928–1999), Scottish author
 Bronwen Knox, Australian water polo player
 Buddy Knox, American rockabilly singer-songwriter
 Cecil Leonard Knox, English recipient of the Victoria Cross
 Charles Knox (disambiguation), several people
 Chris Knox, New Zealand rock 'n' roll musician
 Chuck Knox (1932–2018), American football coach
 Daniel Knox, 6th Earl of Ranfurly, British Second Lieutenant during World War II
 David Knox (disambiguation), several people
 Dawson Knox (born 1996), American football player
 Dilly Knox, British codebreaker and scholar of Greek at King's College, Cambridge
 Dudley Wright Knox, Commodore in the United States Navy during the Spanish–American War and World War I
 Edward Knox (Australian politician) (1819–1901), Australian judge and politician
 H. Edward Knox (born 1937), American politician
 Edward M. Knox (1842–1916), Union Army soldier in the American Civil War and Medal of Honor recipient
 E. V. Knox, poet, satirist, and editor of Punch from 1932 to 1949
 Ellis O. Knox, first African-American to be awarded a PhD on the West Coast of the United States
 Elyse Knox, American actress
 Francis Knox-Gore (1803–1873), Anglo-Irish baronet
 Francis Knox (1754–1821), Member of Parliament for Philipstown, Ireland
 Frank Knox, U.S. Secretary of the Navy under Franklin D. Roosevelt during most of World War II
 George Knox (1765–1827), Irish Tory politician.
 George Knox (disambiguation), several people including
 Sir George Edward Knox, (1845–1922) British judge in India
 Sir George Hodges Knox, Australian politician
 George Hodges Knox (1885–1960), Australian politician
 George L. Knox, escaped slave, activist, publisher and author
 George L. Knox II, U.S. Army Air Force Officer and Tuskegee Airman
 George William Knox, American Presbyterian theologian and writer
 George Williams Knox (1838–1894), British soldier
 Harley E. Knox, American politician who served as mayor of San Diego
 Henry Knox, first U.S. Secretary of War
 James Knox (disambiguation), several people
 James Knox-Gore (1775–1818), Anglo-Irish politician
 Janette Hill Knox (1845-1920), American reformer, suffragist, teacher, author 
 Jim Knox (1919–1991), New Zealand trade unionist and politician
 Jim Knox (American football), Fox Sports American football commentator, see 2000 Oklahoma Sooners football team
 Jim Knox (ice hockey), Canadian ice hockey player, 1966 Memorial Cup
 John Knox (disambiguation), several people
 Johnny Knox (born 1986), American football player
 Jon Knox, American session musician drummer, producer and composer
 Keith Knox (born 1964), Scottish football player and manager
 Keith Knox (boxer), Scottish boxer of the 1990s and 2000s
 Kevin Knox (American football) (born 1971), former American football wide receiver
 Kevin Knox (basketball) (born 1999), American basketball player for the New York Knicks
 Malcolm Knox, Sir Thomas Malcolm Knox (1900–1980), British philosopher and Principal of St Andrews University
 Malcolm Knox (author) (born 1966), Australian journalist and author
 Mike Knox, ring name of Michael Hettinga, American professional wrestler
 Mona Knox (1929–2008), American model and film actress
 Myra Knox (1853–1915), Canadian-born American physician
 Neville Knox, English cricketer
 Northrup R. Knox, sportsman, banker, original principal owner of the Buffalo Sabres
 Philander C. Knox, U.S. Attorney General, Secretary of State and Senator
 Rob Knox (1989–2008), British actor who appears in the film Harry Potter and the Half-Blood Prince (2009)
 Robert Knox (disambiguation), several people

 Sir Robin Knox-Johnston (born 1939), British sailor
 Ronald Knox, English theologian and crime writer
 Rose Knox (née Markward) (1857–1950), American businesswoman
 Russell Knox. Scottish professional golfer
 Sam Knox (1910–1981), American football player
 Seymour H. Knox I, merchant and businessman
 Seymour H. Knox II, Buffalo philanthropist and art exponent
 Seymour H. Knox III, sportsman, banker, original principal owner of the Buffalo Sabres
 Shelby Knox, feminist and sexual education activist 
 Simmie Knox (born 1935), African-American painter
 Steven Knox (born 1974), cricketer who played for Scotland
 Terence Knox (born 1946), American film, stage, and television actor
 Thomas Knox (disambiguation), several people

 Tom Knox, American businessman and politician
 Tom Knox (author), pseudonym of British writer and journalist Sean Thomas
 Tommy Knox (1905–1954), English football goalkeeper
 Uchter Knox, 5th Earl of Ranfurly, Governor of New Zealand
 Vicesimus Knox, English essayist and minister
 Victor A. Knox (1899–1976), U.S. Representative for Michigan
 W. R. Knox (1861–1933), organist in Adelaide, South Australia
 William Knox (disambiguation), several people

Fictional characters
Dlanor A. Knox, from the visual novel series Umineko When They Cry
Ronald Knox, from the Japanese manga series Black Butler
Knox, yellow dog in the Dr. Seuss story, Fox in Socks

See also
 Knox (disambiguation)
 Knox (given name)
 Baron Welles, Viscount Northland, and Earl of Ranfurly (Knox family), Irish peerages created in 1781, 1791 and 1831

References

English-language surnames
Surnames of Lowland Scottish origin